Lazar Castle, is a castle located in Lăzarea, Harghita County, Romania. The citadel is named after the Lázár de Szárhegy noble family and it is built in a combination of Romanesque, Gothic, and Renaissance styles. The oldest part of the building dates from 1532, while the rest was added in 1631–1632.

See also
 List of castles in Romania
 Tourism in Romania
 Villages with fortified churches in Transylvania

References 
 Drăguț, Vasile. Dicționar enciclopedic de artă medievală românescă. București: Editura Științifică și Enciclopedică, 1976.
 Ionescu, Grigore. Arhitectura pe teritoriul României de-a lungul veacurilor. București: Editura Academiei, 1982.
 Ghidul Castelul Lazar din Lăzarea, Centrul de Creație – Lăzarea.

Castles in Romania
Buildings and structures in Harghita County
Historic monuments in Harghita County
Houses completed in 1532
Tourist attractions in Harghita County